Lianhuaqiao is a station on Line 10 of the Beijing Subway. This station opened on December 30, 2012.

Station Layout 
The station has an underground island platform.

Exits 
There are 3 exits, lettered B, C, and D. Exit B is accessible.

Gallery

References

External links

Railway stations in China opened in 2012
Beijing Subway stations in Haidian District